In organic chemistry, the Murai reaction is an organic reaction that uses C-H activation to create a new C-C bond between a terminal or strained internal alkene and an aromatic compound using a ruthenium catalyst.  The reaction, named after Shinji Murai, was first reported in 1993. While not the first example of C-H activation, the Murai reaction is notable for its high efficiency and scope. Previous examples of such hydroarylations required more forcing conditions and narrow scope.

Scope and regiochemistry
The reaction was initially demonstrated using a ketone as the directing group, but other functional groups have been reported, including esters, imines, nitriles, and imidates. Murai reactions have also been reported with disubstituted alkynes. bidentate directing group allow ortho alkylation of aromatic rings with α,β-unsaturated ketones, which typically are unreactive in Murai reactions.

Early examples of the reaction suffered from side products of alkylation at both ortho positions. This problem can be partially solved using an ortho methyl blocking group. Unfortunately, with ortho methyl groups both the rate and generality of the reaction are reduced. Substituents at the meta position influence regioselectivity.  The reaction preferentially adds at the least sterically hindered ortho position, except when there is a meta group capable of coordinating with the Ru catalyst. Methoxyacetophenones show preferential reaction at the more hindered position.

Mechanism 
A variety of Ru catalysts catalyze the Murai reaction, including RuH2(CO)(PPh3)3, RuH2(PPh3)4, Ru(CO)2(PPh3)3, and Ru3(CO)12.

Ru(0) catalysts 
A detailed mechanism for the Murai reaction has not been elucidated. Experimental and computational studies give evidence for at least two different mechanisms, depending on the catalyst. For catalysts such as [Ru(H)2(CO)(PR3)3] which are active as Ru0, a combination of computational density functional studies and experimental evidence has resulted in the following proposed mechanism:

It is proposed that at high temperatures RuH2(CO)(PPh3)3 converts to an unsaturated Ru(CO)(PPh3)n species. The catalytic cycle is proposed to begins with coordination of the ketone followed by oxidative addition of a C-H bond.  The resulting five-coordinated metallocycle is stabilized by an agostic interaction. The C-C bond formation is the rate limiting step.

Ru(II) catalysts 
The complex [Ru(o-C6H4PPh2)(H)(CO)(PPh3)2] catalyzes the Murai reaction at room temperature. For [Ru(H)2(H2)2(PR3)2], the active complex is [Ru(H)2(PR3)2].

After the active form of the ruthenium catalyst complex is generated from 1, acetophenone coordinates to the complex via its carbonyl oxygen and agostically via its ortho C-H bond (2). As in the Ru0 proposed mechanism, this agostic interaction leads to the oxidative addition of the ortho C-H. Reductive elimination releases H2, which remains coordinated, giving complex 3. Coordination of ethylene and decoordination of the ketone results in complex 4 which then undergoes migratory insertion of ethylene into the hydride to give 5. Following oxidative addition of H2 (6), the complex reductively eliminates the product to give the product agostically bound to the complex. Coordination of another acetophenone molecule regenerates complex 2.

References 

Organic reactions